Ulf Selmer (December 10, 1885 – September 24, 1961) was a Norwegian actor and painter.

Selmer was the son of the actor Jens Selmer (1845–1928) at the Christiania Theater and his wife, the actress Eleonora Josephine Nielsen (1850–1930), whose stage name was Leonora Selmer.

Selmer debuted at the Central Theater in 1904; he was in the National Tour traveling ensemble of Ludovica Levy (1856–1922) for one year before he was at the Fahlstrøm Theater for one year. In 1911 he moved to the newly opened Trondheim National Theater, where he remained until 1918. This was followed by three years at Chat Noir and one year at the National Theatre in Oslo before he returned to the Central Theater, where he celebrated the fortieth year of his acting career in 1944. His last appearance on stage was around 1954.

He helped shape Norwegian film from the silent film era to more modern films in the mid-1950s. He made his debut in Den nye lensmannen in 1926, which was directed by Leif Sinding. His last film was Portrettet (1954), directed by Per Aabel.

Selmer was a skilled painter, and some of his works are displayed in the Oslo City Museum.

Filmography
 1926: Den nye lensmannen as Knut Øverbø, a wealthy farmer
 1927: Fjeldeventyret as Østmoe, the bailiff
 1927: Syv dage for Elisabeth as Frantz Markel
 1932: Lalla vinner! as a groom
 1933: Vi som går kjøkkenveien as the landowner Adolf Beck
 1941: Kjærlighet og vennskap as Per Arnesen, a lawyer
 1942: Det æ'kke te å tru as Abel, a wholesaler
 1947: Sankt Hans fest as Sørensen, a hat maker
 1952: Trine! as Uncle Joachim
 1954: Kasserer Jensen as a judge
 1954: Portrettet as Hammer, a pharmacist

References

External links
 
 Ulf Selmer at the Swedish Film Database
 Ulf Selmer at the National Theater Archive

1885 births
1961 deaths
Norwegian male stage actors
Norwegian male film actors
Norwegian male silent film actors
Norwegian male painters
20th-century Norwegian painters
20th-century Norwegian male actors
Male actors from Oslo
Burials at the Cemetery of Our Saviour
20th-century Norwegian male artists